Mevo may refer to the following places in Israel:

Mevo Beitar
Mevo Dotan
Mevo Hama
Mevo Horon
Mevo Modi'im
Rova Mevo Ha'ir